is a station on the Yurikamome Line in Kōtō, Tokyo, Japan. It is numbered "U-10".

Station layout
The station consists of an elevated island platform.

Platforms

History
Aomi Station opened on 1 November 1995.

Surrounding area
The station offers the most direct public transit access to the Venus Fort and Palette Town shopping complex in Odaiba; it also is adjacent to an embarkation pier for the Tokyo water bus lines.

References

External links
Official information site

Railway stations in Tokyo
Yurikamome
Railway stations in Japan opened in 1995